The 2021–22 season was Pyunik's 28th season in the Armenian Premier League.

Season events
On 14 June, Pyunik announced the signing of Aram Kocharyan from Lori, with Edgar Movsesyan joining from Van the next day.

Two days later, 17 June, Vaspurak Minasyan joined Pyunik from Alashkert, with Hayk Ishkhanyan signing from Shirak on 19 June.

On 21 June, Pyunik announced the signing of Yuri Gareginyan from Noah.

On 24 June, Pyunik announced the signing of Juninho on a free transfer after he'd left his previous club Paraná in February 2021.

On 29 June, Zoran Gajić joined Pyunik from Zbrojovka Brno.

On 10 July, Pyunik announced the signing of Grigor Meliksetyan from Ararat Yerevan, with Erik Vardanyan returning to the club on a season-long loan deal from Sochi the next day.

On 14 July, Gevorg Ghazaryan joined Pyunik from AEL Limassol.

On 18 July, Pyunik announced the signing of Hugo Firmino from Cova da Piedade.

On 1 August, Pyunik announced the signing of Adnan Šećerović from Riga.

On 17 August, Pyunik announced the signing of Bruno Nascimento from Al-Hidd.

On 27 August, Pyunik announced the signing of Nikita Baranov from Ħamrun Spartans.

On 31 August, Pyunik announced the signing of Carlitos from Doxa Katokopias.

On 9 September, Pyunik announced the signing of Lazar Jovanović from Mladost Lučani.

On 13 September, Hayk Ishkhanyan left Pyunik by mutual consent, before signing for BKMA Yerevan.

On 16 December, Pyunik announced the signing of Artak Dashyan from Atyrau.

On 20 December, Adnan Šećerović left Pyunik by mutual consent.

On 27 December, Pyunik announced that Sevak Aslanyan, Suren Harutyunyan and Lazar Jovanović had all left the club after their contracts where ended by mutual agreement.

On 17 January, Pyunik announced the signing of Thiago Galvão, with Uroš Nenadović joining from Taraz on 22 January and Eugeniu Cociuc from Zimbru Chișinău on 24 January.

On 27 January, Pyunik announced the signing of Serges Déblé who'd left Ararat Yerevan earlier in January.

On 1 February, Pyunik announced the signing of David Yurchenko from Alashkert.

On 3 February, Pyunik announced the signing of free agent Alexander González.

On 5 February, Pyunik announced the signing of Renzo Zambrano after he'd previously played for Portland Timbers.

On 16 February, Pyunik announced the signing of Gevorg Najaryan after he'd previously played for Shakhter Karagandy.

The following day, 17 February, Vaspurak Minasyan, Edgar Movsesyan and Vrezh Chiloyan all left the club on loan for the remainder of the season.

Squad

Out on loan

Transfers

In

Loans in

Out

Loans out

Released

Friendlies

Competitions

Overall record

Premier League

Results summary

Results by round

Results

Table

Armenian Cup

Statistics

Appearances and goals

|-
|colspan="16"|Players away on loan:
|-
|colspan="16"|Players who left Pyunik during the season:

|}

Goal scorers

Clean sheets

Disciplinary Record

References

FC Pyunik seasons
Pyunik